Guðjón Pétur Lýðsson (born 28 December 1987) is an Icelandic  footballer who plays for Grindavík as a midfielder.

Club career
Guðjón Pétur Lýðsson was an important factor in the team of Haukar that promoted to Úrvalsdeild. After the club was relegated, he was sold to Valur and in the end of the season he went on loan to Helsingborg, where he played couple of matches and won the Swedish league Allsvenskan. After his time at Helsingborg, he went back to play for Valur. In 2013, he was sold to Breiðablik, where he was a key player in the squad. After the 2015 season he rejoined Valur. In 2017 they won the Icelandic League.

On 12 November 2018, Lýðsson signed a 3-year contract with Knattspyrnufélag Akureyrar.

References

External links
 

1987 births
Living people
Association football midfielders
Gudjon Petur Lydsson
Gudjon Petur Lydsson
Gudjon Petur Lydsson
Gudjon Petur Lydsson
Gudjon Petur Lydsson
Helsingborgs IF players
Gudjon Petur Lydsson
Gudjon Petur Lydsson
Gudjon Petur Lydsson
Gudjon Petur Lydsson
Allsvenskan players
Gudjon Petur Lydsson
Gudjon Petur Lydsson
Expatriate footballers in Sweden
Gudjon Petur Lydsson